Dilaram Acharya is a Nepalese politician. He was elected to the Pratinidhi Sabha in the 1999 election, as a candidate of Rashtriya Jana Morcha (the electoral front of the Communist Party of Nepal (Masal) (2006)) in the constituency of Argakhanchi-1 with 23,452 votes.

When Janamorcha Nepal was formed in 2002 through the merger of RJM and Samyukta Janamorcha Nepal, Acharya became a member of JMN. When JMN split in 2006, Acharya sided with Communist Party of Nepal (Unity Centre-Masal) (the parent party of JMN) general secretary Mohan Bikram Singh and Chitra Bahadur K.C. in rejecting participation the Seven Party Alliance government. Effectively JMN was split. A conference of the JMN led by Chitra Bahadur K.C. was held in Butwal May 25–26, 2006, in which Acharya was elected General Secretary of this JMN faction. The Chitra Bahadur K.C./Dilaram Acharya-led JMN was renamed as the Rashtriya Jana Morcha in 2007.

References

Rastriya Janamorcha politicians
Living people
Year of birth missing (living people)
Nepal MPs 1999–2002
Khas people